Shirakumo Shrine is a Shinto shrine in Kyoto Gyoen National Garden, in Kyoto, Japan.

See also
 List of Shinto shrines in Kyoto

External links
 

Shinto shrines in Kyoto